Phong, also known as Kniang, is an Austroasiatic language of the Mon–Khmer family, spoken in Laos.  Its nearest relatives are the fellow Xinh Mul tongues, the Khang language and Puoc language, both spoken in Vietnam.  The number of speakers of Phong-Kniang is estimated at 30,700.

Phong Kaneng  and Phong Kniang are dialects. Phong is spoken in northeastern Laos, such as in Hua Muong, Sam Neua Province.

References

External links 
 http://projekt.ht.lu.se/rwaai RWAAI (Repository and Workspace for Austroasiatic Intangible Heritage)
 http://hdl.handle.net/10050/00-0000-0000-0003-9B78-5@view Phong Laan in RWAAI Digital Archive

Khmuic languages
Languages of Laos